Mayo Gaels is a Gaelic football club located in Mayo Abbey, County Mayo. The club was formed in 1975 and was entered in the championship. One of the club's greatest wins came in 1984 when Mayo Gaels won the Mayo Intermediate Football Championship.

Achievements
 Mayo Intermediate Football Championship: 1984
 Mayo Intermediate Football Championship: 1998

Current Players 
 Antony Byrne
 Eoghan Keane
 Mark Sloyne
 Cian Morley 
 Jack Fallon(mayo)
 John joe Sloyne

References

Gaelic football clubs in County Mayo